Halkidis is a surname. Notable people with the surname include:

Bob Halkidis (born 1966), Canadian ice hockey player
George Halkidis (born 1982), Canadian ice hockey player